The Phyllis J. Tilley Memorial Bridge is a pedestrian bridge in Fort Worth, Texas.

Description
The Phyllis J. Tilley Memorial Bridge crosses over the Trinity River connecting Trinity Park to a new trail that terminates in downtown Fort Worth.

This 368' (112m) long steel stressed ribbon/arch combination bridge is the first of its kind in North America. A steel arch with a span of 163' (49.5m) supports steel stress ribbons and precast concrete planks over the river complementing the adjacent historic Lancaster Avenue vehicular bridge. The arch spans the entire river and the steel stress ribbons rest upon the arch. The minimal sag profile of the stressed ribbons creates major tension loads which are balanced against the thrust loading in the opposite direction caused by the steel arch. The balancing of these opposing loads minimizes the required size of the foundations. Pre-fabricated concrete planks have been anchored directly to the steel stress ribbons to form the bridge walkway, eliminating the need for temporary scaffolding in the river and on the adjacent shorelines. The absence of vertical support struts reduces horizontal loads created by periodic river flooding. At night, the bridge is illuminated by a combination of white and blue LED lights.

Design and construction
The Phyllis J. Tilley Memorial Bridge was completed in 2012, with Freese and Nichols as the Lead Engineering Firm and Engineer of Record. Bridge Architect Miguel Rosales of Boston-based transportation architects Rosales + Partners provided the Conceptual Design, Bridge Architecture and Aesthetic Lighting Design. The Freese Nichols / Rosales + Partners team also collaborated with structural engineers Schlaich Bergermann & Partner. The contractor for the bridge project was Rebcon, Inc. of Dallas, Texas. Funding for the bridge was provided by the Texas Department of Transportation, the City of Fort Worth, and local non-profit organization Streams and Valleys, Inc.

Awards
2013 Engineering Excellence Awards - Eminent Conceptor, American Council of Engineering Companies of Texas (ACES-Texas)
2013 Engineering Excellence Awards - Gold Medal in Structural Systems, American Council of Engineering Companies of Texas (ACES-Texas)
2013 American Road and Transportation Builders Association - Transportation Development Foundation Globe Award
2013 Architizer A+ Awards - Finalist
2013 Engineering News-Record (ENR) Texas & Louisiana Best Project Award for Small Projects (Under $10 Million)
2014 NSBA Prize Bridge Competition - Prize Bridge Award in the Special Purpose Category
2015 Downtown Fort Worth Trailblazer Award - Innovation Award

References

External links

 

Pedestrian bridges in the United States
Transportation buildings and structures in Fort Worth, Texas
Pedestrian bridges in Texas
Bridges completed in 2012
Open-spandrel deck arch bridges in the United States
Steel bridges in the United States
Stressed ribbon bridges in the United States